Anura Wegodapola (born Senevirathne Panditha Abeykoon Bandaranayaka Wasala Mudiyense Ralahamilage Anura Bandara Wegodapola on 23 March 1981) is a Sri Lankan cricketer. He is a left-handed batsman and right-arm off-break bowler who plays for Sri Lanka Navy. He was born in Polgolla.

Wegodapola made his List A debut for the side during the 2009–10 season, against Seeduwa Raddoluwa. From the opening order, he scored 12 runs. He bowled 3 overs in the match, conceding 21 runs.

References

External links
Anura Wegodapola at Cricket Archive

1981 births
Living people
Sri Lankan cricketers
Sri Lanka Navy Sports Club cricketers